Ahmed Megahid Ramzy (Arabic: أحمد رمزي)(born  July 25, 1965) is an Egyptian football player. He was Zamalek's International defender and is now the Assistant Manager of the club. Ahmed Ramzy's friends prefer to call him "Roza".

Titles as a player for National Team 
Ramzy participated in the 1990 FIFA World Cup.

Titles as a player for Zamalek 
3 Egyptian League titles for Zamalek
1 Egyptian Cup titles for Zamalek
2 African Champions League titles
1 African Super Cup for Zamalek
1 Afro-Asian Cup for Zamalek

Titles as a Manager for Zamalek 
2 Egyptian League titles for Zamalek
1 Egyptian Cup title for Zamalek
2 Egyptian Super Cup titles for Zamalek
1 African Champions' League title
1 African Cup Winners' Cup for Zamalek
1 African Super Cup title (2002)

References

1965 births
Living people
Egyptian footballers
Egypt international footballers
1990 FIFA World Cup players
1992 African Cup of Nations players
Zamalek SC players
Egyptian football managers
Zamalek SC managers
Egyptian Premier League players
Association football defenders